Fairchild Mountain is a high mountain summit in the Mummy Range of the Rocky Mountains of North America.

See also

List of Colorado mountain ranges
List of Colorado mountain summits
List of Colorado fourteeners
List of Colorado 4000 meter prominent summits
List of the most prominent summits of Colorado
List of Colorado county high points

References

External links

Mountains of Rocky Mountain National Park
Mountains of Larimer County, Colorado
North American 4000 m summits